William Arthur Smith Benson (17 October 1854 – 5 July 1924) was an English designer active in the Arts and Crafts Movement.

References 
 Ian Hamerton (Ed.): W.A.S. Benson: Arts & Crafts Luminary and Pioneer of Modern Design. Antique Collectors' Club, 2005, .
 Caroline Dakers: The Holland Park Circle: Artists and Victorian Society. Yale University Press, 1999, .
 Charlotte Fiell, Peter Fiell (Hrsg.): 1000 Lights: 1878-1959, Band 1. Taschen Verlag, 2005, .
 Benson, William: Arthur Smith (1854-1924), metalwork designer. Page 60, John D. Culme in Oxford Dictionary of National Biography. Suppl. 11. Missing persons from the beginning to 1985. Publisher: Oxford University Press 1993 (Online in the Internet archive)

External links 

 Benson's works in the Art Institute Chicago
 Copper tray 
 Benson's work on Pinterest
 Benson Trademarks
 WAS Benson: Genius of the Arts & Crafts
 W.A.S. BENSON ARTS & CRAFTS ADJUSTABLE BRASS TABLE LAMP  Christie's  Sale 5743, Lot 432 — of 22 June 2010
 Benson's work
 Designed by Benson ca. 1895, made by Morris & Co.

English designers
1854 births
1924 deaths
William